John Gifford may refer to:
John Gifford (writer) (1758–1818), English political writer
John Hoskins Gifford (c. 1693–1744), British politician
Jack Gifford (John F. Gifford, 1941–2009), American engineer and businessman
Sir John Gifford, 2nd Baronet, of the Gifford baronets
Rufus Gifford (John Rufus Gifford , born 1974), American diplomat

See also

John Giffard (disambiguation)